Adam Hess is a British comedian and writer.  He performed at the 2016 Edinburgh Festival Fringe and had positive reviews in The Times.

Notable performances

Fosters Best Newcomer 2015 Nominee
Live At The Palladium (ITV)
Live From The BBC (BBC2)
@Elevenish (ITV2)
Count Arthur Strong (BBC1)
Staff-writer for Russell Howard's Good News
The Daily Telegraph's Funniest Tweet of 2013

References

External links
Official Website
 

Living people
British male comedians
Year of birth missing (living people)